Idiofa Territory is an administrative area in the Kwilu Province of the Democratic Republic of the Congo.
The capital is the town of Idiofa.

Location

The Loange River defines the eastern boundary of the territory, while the Kamtsha River flows through the west of the territory. Other rivers include the Lubue and the PioPio. All these rivers flow from south to north, emptying into the Kasai River, which defines the northern boundary.

People

The territory currently has a population of 1,450,035.  The many ethnic groups today include the Bunda, Pende, Dinga, Lori, Ngoli, Wongo, Yansi, Lele and Nzadi.

French is the administrative language, but almost all the people speak Kikongo, one of the four national languages of the DRC. Some of the younger people also speak Lingala.

Administration

The colonial administrators originally named the territory "Babunda Territory" after the largest ethnic group, the Bunda people.
The Territory was renamed the Kamtsha-Lubue Territory after the largest of the rivers.
Later the territory was extended east, renamed again to the Kamtsha-Luange Territory.

The Idiofa Territory today has five cities and 12 sectors.
The cities are Idiofa, Dibaya-Lubwe, Mangai, Panu, Mongombala (at Bulungu border), and Kalo (Kamtsha-Loange).
The sectors are Banga, Belo, Bulwem, Kalanganda, Kanga, Kapia, Kipuku, Madimbi, Mateko, Musanga-Idiofa, Sedzo and Yasa-Lokwa.

References

Territories of Kwilu Province